The Draft are a band featuring Hot Water Music members Jason Black, George Rebelo and Chris Wollard. The band also features guitarist Todd Rockhill of Black Cougar Shock Unit, Discount and a host of other Gainesville, Florida based acts.

The Draft formed soon after the departure of singer/guitarist Chuck Ragan from Hot Water Music. The three remaining members of the band wanted to continue making music together, but decided not to continue under the Hot Water Music name, choosing instead to start fresh.

In 2006, The Draft began touring. Their debut album, In a Million Pieces, was released on September 12, 2006.

On March 13, 2007, The Draft released a self-titled digital EP through all major music download services.

In mid-October 2007, The Draft released the We'll Never Know/Hard to Be Around It 7" on No Idea Records. The two songs are also available through iTunes.

The Draft reunited for a tour in summer 2013.

Discography

Full Length Albums
 In a Million Pieces - 2006, Epitaph Records

EPs
 The Draft - 2007, Epitaph Records, Digital EP
 We'll Never Know/Hard to Be Around It - 2007, No Idea Records, 7" Vinyl and Digital EP

References

External links 
The Draft on Myspace
Interview with Jason Black of The Draft on Late Night Wallflower

Epitaph Records artists
Musical groups from Gainesville, Florida
American post-hardcore musical groups
2006 establishments in Florida
Musical groups established in 2006